(Christians, engrave this day), 63, is a church cantata by Johann Sebastian Bach.

History and words 
The cantata is Bach's earliest extant cantata for Christmas Day, possibly composed in Weimar as early as 1713. The text of the cantata, which echoes theologians in Halle, suggests that it was composed with Halle's  in mind, in 1713, when Bach applied to be organist of this church, or in 1716, when he was involved in rebuilding its organ. The text is possibly by that church's  Johann Michael Heineccius, who also wrote the libretti for other Bach cantatas definitely written for Halle and had favoured Bach's application for organist at the church as a successor to Friedrich Wilhelm Zachow. Musicologist Christoph Wolff deduces from the "lavish forces" of four trumpets, timpani and three oboes on top of the strings, an unprecedented scoring in Bach's cantatas, that the work was not composed for the intimate  in Weimar. He dates it as 1714 or 1715. According to John Eliot Gardiner, the first performance may have taken place in Weimar in the church of St. Peter und Paul, performed by the combined musicians of the ducal Capelle and the town.

The prescribed readings for the feast day were from the Epistle of Titus, "God's mercy appeared" or from Isaiah, "Unto us a child is born", and from the Gospel of Luke, the Nativity, Annunciation to the shepherds and the angels' song. The poet wrote a text centered in symmetry around a recitative, framed by two duets, two more recitatives and two equal chorus movements. The lack of a closing chorale, which closes most of Bach's later cantatas, has raised the question if the work is based on a secular cantata.

According to Gardiner, the cantata was performed again to celebrate the bicentennial of the Reformation in Halle in 1717. The musicologist Julian Mincham assumes that Bach chose this cantata for his first Christmas as  because "an inspired piece that commenced and concluded with impressive choruses, was exactly the right work for the occasion and nothing new was likely to eclipse it." It demanded the largest group of performers since Bach had begun his post half a year before, asking for four trumpets, timpani and three oboes in addition to the regular four voice parts and strings. Bach performed the cantata in Leipzig at least one more time, possibly in 1729.

Scoring and structure 
The cantata in seven movements is festively scored for four vocal soloists (soprano, alto, tenor, and bass), a four-part choir, four trumpets, timpani, three oboes, bassoon, two violins, viola, organ in a later version, and continuo.

 Chorus: 
 Recitative (alto): 
 Aria (soprano, bass): 
 Recitative (tenor): 
 Aria (alto, tenor): 
 Recitative (bass): 
 Chorus:

Music 
The cantata has a festive character but lacks certain features typically associated with Christmas music, such as Pastoral music, angels' song and cradle song, even a Christmas carol or chorale, as Gardiner words it: "The cantata contains none of the usual Nativity themes: no cradle song, no music for the shepherds or for the angels, not even the standard Christmas chorales". The symmetry of the text around the recitative "" (So now, today, the anxious sorrow is changed … into pure blessing and grace) is reflected in the music. The recitatives lean toward arioso at times, typical for Bach's music in the period. The choral movements show da capo form, but with distinctly contrasting middle sections, which relates to motet style. Wolff describes  these movements as "fanfare-like frameworks", a cantabile choral setting contrasting with virtuoso orchestral playing in "secular dance".

Gardiner observes that the first recitative for alto, accompanied by the strings, contains "tortuous passage[s] in which voice and continuo struggle to free themselves from "Satan's slavish chains"". The cantata contains two duets, rare in Bach's cantatas, likely an expression of communal rejoicing which is expressed better in a duet than by a single voice. The second duet is a minuet, illustrating the words "" (Come, you Christians, come to dance). Instead of the usual closing chorale, the cantata ends with a chorus "conceived on the largest of scales", full of energy. The trumpets begin with pompous fanfares, the voices first sing a fanfare, addressing the "highest", then open a permutation fugue which is later expanded by instrumental doubling and counteraction, to express the thanks of the devout souls. The middle section is a second fugue in similar style which ends with a "preposterous collective trill" on the word "" (torment), observed by Mincham as "a passage of extraordinary intensity. The tempo slows, the harmony becomes tragic and chromatic and the whole feeling is that of deepest melancholy at the very thought of Satan’s embrace". Then a da capo of the complete first section ends the cantata on "the original celebratory flourishes of the complete ritornello theme".

In one of the later performances Bach changed the part of obbligato oboe in movement 3 to an organ, writing it himself in the part for the continuo organ.

Recordings 
 J. S. Bach: Cantata BWV 63, Michael Gielen, Wiener Kammerchor, Vienna State Opera Orchestra, Margit Opawsky, Hilde Rössel-Majdan, Waldemar Kmentt, Harald Hermann, Vanguard Bach Guild  1952
 J. S. Bach: Cantata 63, Christen, ätzet diesen Tag, and the Magnificat, Günther Ramin, Thomanerchor, Gewandhausorchester, Ulrike Taube, Sibylla Plate, Gert Lutze, Hannes Hans Hauptmann, Schola Antiqua 1953
 Die Bach Kantate Vol. 61, Helmuth Rilling, Gächinger Kantorei, Bach-Collegium Stuttgart, Maria Friesenhausen, Julia Hamari, Adalbert Kraus, Wolfgang Schöne, Hänssler 1971
 Bach Cantatas Vol. 1 – Advent and Christmas, Karl Richter, Münchener Bach-Chor, Münchener Bach-Orchester. Edith Mathis, Anna Reynolds, Peter Schreier, Dietrich Fischer-Dieskau, Archiv Produktion 1972
 J. S. Bach: Das Kantatenwerk – Complete Cantatas Vol. 16, Nikolaus Harnoncourt, Tölzer Knabenchor, Concentus Musicus Wien, Peter Jelosits (soloist of Wiener Sängerknaben), Paul Esswood, Kurt Equiluz, Ruud van der Meer, Teldec 242565-2 1976
 J. S. Bach: Complete Cantatas Vol. 3, Ton Koopman, Amsterdam Baroque Orchestra & Choir, Ruth Holton, Elisabeth von Magnus, Paul Agnew, Klaus Mertens, Antoine Marchand 1995
 J. S. Bach: Cantatas Vol. 7, Masaaki Suzuki, Bach Collegium Japan, Ingrid Schmithüsen, Yoshikazu Mera, Makoto Sakurada, Peter Kooy, BIS 1997
 J. S. Bach: Christmas Cantatas, John Eliot Gardiner, Monteverdi Choir, English Baroque Soloists, Ann Monoyios, Sara Mingardo, Rufus Müller, Stephan Loges, Soli Deo Gloria 1998
 Bach Edition Vol. 18 – Cantatas Vol. 9, Pieter Jan Leusink, Holland Boys Choir, Netherlands Bach Collegium, Marjon Strijk, Sytse Buwalda, Nico van der Meel, Bas Ramselaar, Brilliant Classics 2000
 J. S. Bach: Christmas Cantatas from Leipzig, Philippe Herreweghe, Collegium Vocale Gent, Carolyn Sampson, Ingeborg Danz, Mark Padmore, Sebastian Noack, Harmonia Mundi France 2002
 Bach: Cantata 63; Mendelssohn: Vom Himmel hoch; Vaughan Williams: The First Nowell, Vladimir Jurowski, London Philharmonic Orchestra and Choir, Lisa Milne, Ruxandra Donose, Andrew Staples, Christopher Maltman, LPO 2009
 Thomanerchor Leipzig – Das Kirchenjahr mit Bach, Vol. 2: Weihnachten · Christmas – Cantatas BWV 63, 110, 190, Georg Christoph Biller, Thomanerchor, Gewandhausorchester, soloist of the Thomanerchor, Christoph Genz, Matthias Weichert, Rondeau Production 2011

References

Sources 

 
 Christen, ätzet diesen Tag BWV 63; BC A 8 / Sacred cantata (1st Christmas Day) Leipzig University
 Cantata BWV 63 Christen, ätzet diesen Tag history, scoring, sources for text and music, translations to various languages, discography, discussion, bach-cantatas website
 BWV 63 Christen, ätzet diesen Tag English translation, University of Vermont
 BWV 63 Christen, ätzet diesen Tag text, scoring, University of Alberta

External links 
 Christen, ätzet diesen Tag, BWV 63: performance by the Netherlands Bach Society (video and background information)

Church cantatas by Johann Sebastian Bach
1713 compositions
Christmas cantatas